The 2012 Gatorade Duels were a pair of stock car races held on February 23, 2012, at Daytona International Speedway in Daytona Beach, Florida. The 60-lap races, held before a crowd of 80,000 spectators, were the qualifying races for the 2012 Daytona 500, the premier event of the 2012 NASCAR Sprint Cup Series. The first race was won by Tony Stewart for the Stewart-Haas Racing team. Dale Earnhardt Jr. finished second, with Marcos Ambrose third. Matt Kenseth driving for the Roush Fenway Racing team won the second race, which was Kenseth's and his team's first victory in the Gatorade Duels. Regan Smith followed in the second position and Jimmie Johnson was third.

Carl Edwards led the first race from pole position on the first lap until he shared the lead with Stewart over the following three laps. Afterward, Earnhardt moved into the first position on the fifth lap, holding it until a caution period for a multi-car accident on lap nine. Denny Hamlin assumed the lead at the lap 15 before Stewart retook it a lap later. Hamlin returned to the lead with a pass on Stewart during the 17th lap, and he maintained the position until his pit stop 26 laps later. Stewart reclaimed the lead on lap 43 and he maintained it for the remaining 17 laps and two further caution periods to achieve victory in the first Gatorade Duel. There were three cautions and eight lead changes among five different drivers over the course of the first race.

During the second race, Greg Biffle was the leader at the start. On the fourth lap, Kenseth passed Biffle to take over the lead. He lost the position when Joey Logano and Kyle Busch moved into the top two places on the 13th lap. Biffle passed Kyle Busch by the 23rd lap and held it during his pit stop 14 laps later. With three laps remaining in the race, Kenseth attempted a race-winning slingshot and passed Biffle when the final lap started and he maintained it to finish first in the second Gatorade Duel. There were five lead changes among five different drivers and no cautions were shown during the course of the second race.

Background

The Gatorade Duels were a duo of stock car racing qualifiers that took place on February 23, 2012, in Daytona Beach, Florida, at Daytona International Speedway, a superspeedway that holds NASCAR races. Its standard track is a four-turn,  superspeedway. Daytona's turns are banked at 31 degrees and the front stretch (the location of the finish line) is banked at 18 degrees. The defending winners of the races were Kurt Busch and Jeff Burton.

In the early years, qualifying for the Daytona 500 had varying formats: from one timed lap, to the average of two laps, to the better of two laps. The idea of having two individual races to establish the starting lineup of the Daytona 500 dates back to the first race in 1959. The first of the 100-mile (160 km) qualifying races consisted of Convertible division cars and the second of Grand National cars. Prior to 1971, the races yielded points to the Drivers' Championship. Large well-established teams approach the races as practice sessions for the Daytona 500 while a successful qualification into the event for smaller less-established teams would enable their entry into future NASCAR events during the season. An unsuccessful qualification meant the team would risk closing down until sponsorship was found.

The top 35 drivers were assigned to Gatorade Duel races based upon their qualifying positions in the Daytona 500. Drivers who qualified in odd-number positions competed in the first Duel along with the winner of the 2012 Daytona 500 pole. Competitors who qualified in even-numbered places took part in the second Duel. The drivers' finishing positions in both Duels determined their starting positions in the Daytona 500. Positions 40 to 42 were filled with the quickest drivers who did not qualify in the top 35. 43rd place was occupied by an eligible past champion. In the event a past champion was not available, the 43rd position would be filled by the next-fastest driver. Two drivers outside the top 35 were eligible for two transfer spots in each Duel which allowed them to qualify for the Daytona 500.

Practice and qualification

Two 90-minute practice sessions were held on February 22. Matt Kenseth was quickest in the first practice session, with a time of 44.809 seconds. Trevor Bayne was second-quickest with a lap-time 0.009 seconds slower. Ricky Stenhouse Jr., with a time of 44.849 seconds, was third-fastest, ahead of Marcos Ambrose and Mark Martin. Clint Bowyer, Michael McDowell and Kevin Harvick. Paul Menard and Kasey Kahne completed the top ten. During the session, Brad Keselowski slowed to avoid Ryan Newman, causing Clint Bowyer to turn into Keselowski, whose car went spinning into the grass on the backstretch. Keselowski's car sustained minor damage; his team could repair it, meaning he was not required to use a backup car. Aric Almirola led the second practice, in which 25 drivers competed, with a lap of 45.065 seconds—nearly one-tenth of a second faster than David Stremme. David Ragan was third, ahead of Robert Richardson Jr. and Greg Biffle. Bobby Labonte, Joe Nemechek, Bill Elliott, Michael Waltrip and Kahne completed the top ten ahead of the races.

During the session, in which drivers ran in packs and drafted off each other, Juan Pablo Montoya made contact with Kahne and sent his car spinning into the grass on the front stretch, tearing off some of its nose. Kahne was required to use a backup car for the rest of Speedweeks. Because the qualifying grids were chosen by the order in which drivers qualified in Daytona 500 pole position qualifying, the pole was given to Carl Edwards in the first race and to Biffle in the second. Edwards was joined on the grid's front row by Dale Earnhardt Jr., with Ambrose in third. Stenhouse and Bayne started in fourth and fifth positions respectively. Biffle was joined by Mears on the front row for the second race, with Jeff Gordon in third. Martin Truex Jr. started fourth, and was followed by Martin in fifth. The thirteen drivers who were not guaranteed to qualify for the Daytona 500 and were required to get into the event on speed or being the highest-placed two drivers who were not guaranteed entry were Elliott, Bayne, Robby Gordon, Kenny Wallace, Richardson, Tony Raines, Stremme, Dave Blaney, Mike Wallace, Waltrip, J. J. Yeley, Nemechek, and McDowell.

Qualifying 1 and 2 results

Races
The qualifying races for the 2012 Daytona 500 began at 2:00 p.m. Eastern Standard Time and was broadcast live on television in the United States by Speed, and by TSN2 in Canada. Commentary was provided by Mike Joy, with analysis given by former driver Darrell Waltrip and former crew chief Larry McReynolds.

Dr. L. Ronald Durham of Greater Friendship Missionary Baptist Church in Daytona Beach, Florida began the pre-race ceremonies with an invocation. Vocalist Catrina Mack from Orlando, Florida performed the national anthem.

A majority of the two-vehicle draft tandems that were observed during the 2011 races at Daytona and greatly disliked by fans appeared to be largely absent; vehicles could not stay linked together for long periods of time before the engine in the following car overheated.

Race 1

Following the invocation and the performance of the National Anthem, three-time Olympic gold medallist swimmer Ryan Lochte commanded the drivers to start their engines. Edwards maintained his pole position lead going into the first corner with Earnhardt in second. On lap two, Tony Stewart passed Edwards around the outside to take the lead. Edwards, with assistance from Bayne, moved in front of Stewart going into turn three to reclaim the first position two laps later. On the fifth lap, Earnhardt moved into the lead and Ambrose moved into second place. Edwards temporarily moved back into first before Earnhardt reclaimed the position. Bayne, who also battled for the lead, had moved down the field by lap seven. On lap nine, Michael McDowell made contact with David Gilliland's left-rear quarter panel between turns one and two; Gilliland went right up the track towards the outside wall, and collected Menard and Montoya, triggering the first caution of the race and the appearance of the pace car. Keselowski was also caught up in the wreckage and his car sustained minor damage. Gilliand, Menard and Montoya retired their cars in the garage with significant car damage. Most of the drivers, including Earnhardt, made pit stops for fuel. Earnhardt was required to make an additional pit stop after one of his pit crew went over the wall too soon, dropping him down the field.

The race was restarted on lap 14, with Ambrose leading Denny Hamlin (both of whom opted not to make pit stops) Almirola, Stewart and Jamie McMurray. Hamlin passed Ambrose to take the lead one lap later. Stewart, with aid from Burton, took over the lead from Hamlin one lap later. Hamlin reclaimed the lead on lap 17 and McDowell moved into second place. Hamlin continued to maintain his lead over the next four laps while McMurray battled with Stewart for second. McDowell had fallen to eighth by lap 21, while Stewart continued in second by lap 25. On the 28th lap, McMurray tried an overtake around the outside of Hamlin for the lead at turn three but could not complete the maneuver, causing him to drop to eighth two laps later. As early as midway through the race, crew chiefs made requests to their drivers to conserve fuel. On lap 32, the top five were Hamlin, Stewart, Harvick, Stenhouse and Ambrose.

As the cars ran in single file, Edwards had dropped to 15th place one lap later. McDowell was told by his team to save fuel on lap 43. Green flag pit stops began on lap 44 when Hamlin and Ambrose stopped for tyres and fuel, allowing Stewart to assume the lead with Kevin Harvick in second and Stenhouse in third. After exiting pit lane following a pit stop and returning to racing speed, Michael Waltrip lost control of his car on the backstraightaway after driving from the side of the track onto the high banking on the race track, and crashed into the backstretch wall eight laps later. The incident caused the second caution to be shown as every driver except Stewart, Harvick and Edwards stopped for fuel. This enabled drivers who were not drafting the race leader and teams who were conserving fuel to finish the race to return to contention. Stewart, Harvick and Edwards led at the lap 57 restart. Two laps later, Earnhardt and Edwards temporarily moved to the front of the field but Stewart retook the lead on the same lap.

On the final lap, McMurray drove down from the top lane after exiting turn two, and went into Almirola in the middle lane, causing Almirola to make contact with Danica Patrick on the inside lane while on the backstraightaway, sending her spinning into the inside SAFER wall which she struck with the right-hand side of her car, sustaining significant damage. The impact broke up much of the car's front-end, and she removed her hands from the steering wheel to avoid fracturing her wrists and thumbs from the sudden impact to the steering column. The crash caused the third and final caution of the race to be shown. Patrick was unhurt; she was able to walk to an ambulance that took her to the in-field medical center. She was evaluated and released from the medical center. Bayne's splitter sustained minor damage when he drove over a spring from Patrick's car. The field was frozen in place, with the order of finish determined by where the drivers were when the caution began. This gave Stewart the win, his third Daytona 500 qualifying race victory in five years. Earnhardt finished second, and Ambrose finished third. Burton and Edwards completed the top five finishers. McDowell and Robby Gordon won the two transfers that got them entry to the Daytona 500. The first race had a total of three cautions and eight lead changes among five different drivers. Hamlin's total of 27 laps led was the most of any competitor. Stewart led three times for a total of 21 laps.

Race 2

Following the first Gatorade Duel, the Lead Category Manager at supermarket chain Harris Teeter, Steve Kravitz, commanded the drivers to start their engines. During the pace laps, Kahne had to move to the rear of the field because he had switched to his backup car. He was joined by Clint Bowyer—whose qualifying time was disallowed because his car twice failed the post-race inspection for height sticks, and Bill Elliott—who had switched his car's engine. Biffle maintained his pole position advantage heading into the first turn, followed by Casey Mears. On lap three, Kenseth moved into the outside line to prepare for a race-lead overtake and was helped by Johnson. Kenseth took over the lead on the following lap with Johnson in second; Biffle was pushed down to third. By the twelfth lap, the top ten drivers were separated by one second as Joey Logano and Kyle Busch moved to the front two positions by lap 14. Elliott Sadler nearly lost control of his car between the first and second turns on lap 16 but was able to continue. Kenseth unsuccessfully tried to pass Kyle Busch on the outside of turn four on lap 17 when Busch blocked Kenseth.

Kyle Busch moved into the lead on the 18th lap, while Logano moved down the field. After starting from 14th, Dave Blaney had moved up nine positions to fifth by lap 21; Logano had moved into third by the same lap. Biffle moved into the lead on lap 23. Kenseth, who was drafting off teammate Biffle, encountered overheating problems and fell to ninth position. Biffle and Kyle Busch started to contest the lead through the fourth turn on lap 26, and the pair traded the position over the following two laps. Biffle gained the lead position on the 29th lap. By lap 33, Regan Smith and Sadler had moved into third and fourth positions respectively. Biffle had reported debris in turn two but officials could not locate it. Green flag pit stops began on lap 40; Kenseth, Logano and Kyle Busch made their pit stops on lap 42 while Biffle, Smith and Jimmie Johnson made pit stops on the following lap.

After the pit stops had been completed, Biffle reclaimed the first position, while Smith moved into second and Johnson was in third. The top three drivers were followed by Sadler and Kenseth. Kyle Busch was drafting off Logano throughout lap 46 but suffered with engine problems, allowing Logano to pull away. The top five were Biffle, Smith, Johnson, Sadler and Kenseth by the 50th lap. Kenseth had fallen to 13th but recovered to fifth after his crew chief Jimmy Fennig put Kenseth on a fuel-only pit stop. Johnson went up the track on lap 52, but regained control of his car. Six laps later, after the leaders ran single file, Kenseth received help from Johnson while running on the outside line to prepare for a race winning slingshot. Kenseth overtook his teammate Biffle on the inside in the tri-oval just after they started the final lap; Biffle had ignored an instruction by his crew chief Matt Puccia to stay on the yellow line and shield the bottom of the circuit and instead steered right to the outside to try and block onrushing cars, losing him momentum. Smith overtook Johnson on the backstraightaway for second following contact between both drivers.

Kenseth maintained the lead and crossed the finish line on lap 60 to win the race. Smith finished in second and Johnson third. Sadler and Biffle rounded out the top five finishers. Blaney and Nemechek earned the second pair of transfer spots that qualified them for the Daytona 500. Bayne, Tony Raines and David Stremme qualified for the Daytona 500 due to their qualifying speeds, with Terry Labonte using a champion's provisional to qualify. Waltrip, Richardson, Bill Elliott, Mike Wallace, Kenny Wallace and Yeley were the six drivers who failed to qualify for the Daytona 500 because they did not finish high enough in their respective Duels or set a fast-enough qualifying lap. The second race had a total of five lead changes among four different drivers and no cautions were shown. Biffle's total of 40 laps led was the highest of any competitor. Kenseth led two times for a total of ten laps.

Post-race comments
After the first race, Stewart drove to the victory lane; the win earned him $55,725. He said, "The fact that we've won 17 times here and not won on the right day is proof it's good momentum, but it's no guarantee obviously. It's nice to come here, especially for Steve and I, being our first race together, to be able to come out and have two really good strong and solid races back-to-back is an awesome start for us." Earnhardt felt that the race was "pretty good" and praised Stewart for his victory. He also said that he aimed to start the Daytona 500 without using a backup car. Ambrose was happy with his third-place finish, "We learned a lot for Sunday, we got a good result. We are smiling right now but it was very close to being the other way around." He also said he was hoping to carry on his good form into the Daytona 500.

Waltrip, who failed to qualify for the Daytona 500 after crashing on lap 52, said he felt he had let everyone down, adding, "It's just really hard. I don't know what to say. It's just sad." Truex commented on his team owner Waltrip's non-qualification, "It's a tough one for him, He's been coming here a long time and this race means everything to him. It was hard to watch that." Patrick, who was hit by Almirola on the final lap and crashed heavily into the wall, said, "It sucks [to hit the wall like that]. You just have to brace yourself. I guess in these situations, I just have to be glad that I'm a small driver and that I've got room. Kinda hug it in and let it rip." She also said the crash was "a blessing in a big disguise". Patrick, along with Gilliland, Montoya and Menard, were required to drive their backup cars for the Daytona 500. After the wreck on lap nine, Gilliland cut his thumb on his helmet; the thumb required one stitch but he was confident about driving his backup car. According to Menard, who was involved in the lap nine wreck, "Somebody turned (David) Gilliland; I saw him get sideways underneath me. I was three lanes up and I tried to clear him and didn't quite make it." It took 56 minutes and 34 seconds to complete the first race; because it ended under caution, no margin of victory was recorded.

After winning the second race, Kenseth drove to the victory lane; earning $56,726 for the victory. Kenseth's victory gave he and his team Roush Fenway Racing their first win in the Gatorade Duels. Kenseth said, "Jimmie Johnson gave me a huge push there and really worked nice for me the whole race. Without that push it never would've got there. Greg lost his drafting partner. We were able to separate him and the #78 [Regan Smith] and we had such a big run that Greg was kind of a sitting duck." Second-place finisher Smith stated while he would have preferred to win the race, he did not have any complaints, "It's good to know that we have a car capable of running up front." Johnson, who finished third, said, "It was an awesome race. We really had a shot to win that one. It was unfortunate there at the end that there were some lapped cars that were kind of mixed in with the leaders. It would have been nice if they would have let us race there; at least from the white flag on." Biffle admitted that he should have remained on the inside line. It took 46 minutes and 23 seconds to complete the second race, and the margin of victory was 0.209 seconds.

After the races, there was continued discussion about overheating engines in high temperatures. Harvick said the temperatures of around  had affected the racing, the grills were "too tight" and competitors chose to remain in a single-file formation because of overheating. Smith said he believed there was no efficient method of tackling the problem. McMurray advocated the widening of the grille, saying, "it was a little hard to race because you got too hot". One day after the second race, NASCAR announced that no further changes would be made. Menard criticized the style of driving that was observed during both races, saying, "NASCAR is trying to dictate physics. Physics says two cars are going to push and they're trying to make rule changes to keep us from doing it, so it's kind of hybrid pack racing and tandem racing. It's causing a pretty unsafe situation." Robby Gordon was critical that Terry Labonte received a champion's provisional, saying, "When you look at it, besides pure speed, I think three guys make it on speed and, obviously, Terry takes a past champion. I disagree with that." He conceded, "But it is what it is. It's the rules. Like I said, we don't make the rules, we just play by them, and sometimes you can't manipulate them."

Race results 1 and 2

References

Gatorade Duels
Gatorade Duels
Gatorade Duels
NASCAR races at Daytona International Speedway